Wolny (feminine Wolna) is a Polish surname. It is also a Germanized version of the Czech surname Volný. Notable people with the surname include:

 Dariusz Wolny (born 1960), Polish swimmer
 Dariusz Wolny (born 1969), Polish swimmer
 Franz Wolny, Austrian footballer
 Jakub Wolny (born 1995), Polish ski jumper
 Ryszard Wolny (born 1969), Polish wrestler

References

See also
 Wollny

Polish-language surnames